Lincoln Castle Academy is a secondary school with academy status located on the north side of the historic city of Lincoln in  Lincolnshire, England. It is situated a couple of miles due north of Lincoln Castle, and just west of the Ermine Street Roman road heading north out of Lincoln towards the River Humber.

History
Lincoln Castle Academy was established on 1 April 2011, after the former Yarborough School was granted academy status.

In 2021 the school removed Business studies, it is currently unknown why this change was made though the school still does Media Studies and ICT as optional studies for GCSEs.

On 18 to 19 July during the British 2022 heatwave, the school didn't allow students to wear cool clothing such as PE kits and summer clothing, this made parents mad and due to this, the school's Facebook page disappeared from the site due to lots of angry parents complaining about this. This also caused local new such as the Lincolnite to report on this, this also caused the Sun and a Welsh news site to report on this giving the school a bad reputation, the following day, 19 July the school allowed non-school uniform as a repose to this and then later that day they closed the school for the day at 1 pm.

In September 2022 the school was rated inadequate by Ofsted which caused the school to get news articles made about it by the Lincolnite and Lincolnshire Live.

Yarborough School
The Conservatives took control of council in 1967, by a majority of ten, which increased to 21 in early May 1968; in February 1968, Lincoln Education Committee had shelved plans for the school, to replace two overcrowded schools; the education committee chairman was Conservative councillor Gilbert Blades. There were plans for a £450,000 swimming pool in Lincoln, which were cancelled in July 1970; instead, a 33m £250,000 pool would built at the school, and one at Boultham Moor Secondary School.

The new assistant headmaster would be Kenneth Hunter, head of English of the City Grammar School for Boys, in Lincoln, who attended Coalville Grammar School and the University of Birmingham in 1953. Although the first Headteacher, Eric Wilson, was recruited in September 1970, students began attending from 7 January 1971.

Yarborough School officially opened on the Riseholme Road site on 27 March 1971.

It was a mixed comprehensive education school for students aged 11 and over, replacing the previous Rosemary Secondary Modern for Boys and Spring Hill Secondary Modern for Girls schools. The majority of the original staff also transferred from those schools.

In January 1972 it was decided to build a £350,000 sports centre, with 25m six-lane swimming pool. A Phase II building programme, which included the Gymnasium and a Craft block for wood and metal work, opened in September 1973.

A devastating fire was started on the night of 5 September 1975 at the end of the first week of term, which destroyed the original ‘East Block’ building. Within a fortnight the first of 11 temporary classrooms had arrived, with lessons also taking place at Bishop Grosseteste University, Lincoln's Drill Hall and Riseholme College of Agriculture.

Staff organised a morale-boosting party on 20 September but the fire-ravaged scene was devastating, with over £600,000 worth of damage. What books were salvaged from the library were moved to a temporary home in the school's main reception.

A local man was convicted of arson on 3 December 1975 and sentenced to six years' imprisonment.

Yarborough School developed a reputation for its sporting prowess during the 1970s, assisted by it having access to the adjoining Yarborough Leisure Centre during academic hours. Yarborough Leisure Centre was first used by the public on 26 April 1976 but the official opening, by then Lincoln City FC manager, Graham Taylor, was on 18 June 1976.

With its facilities, playing fields and running track, Yarborough School was frequently the host of county-wide sporting competitions.

A new Sixth Form centre, now Lincoln Castle Academy's Resource Centre, opened on 7 January 1977 and by 7 September a new Art, Needlework and Home Economics block had opened near the existing Technology and Craft buildings.

On 17 January 1978, after a longer than normal Christmas break to save money due to the expense of heating oil, the current 'East Block' was opened, with a new Music building completing the construction programme.

In September 1989 a number of students joined Yarborough School from  South Park High School, Lincoln and Sturton by Stow Secondary Modern School, both of which officially closed in August 1989. South Park's languages laboratory also moved to Yarborough after the closure.

January 1991 marked Yarborough's 20th anniversary; remarkably eight members of the original teaching staff were still there.

A year later, on 1 January 1992, the school, like many others across the country, gained Grant Maintained Status.

Two new Science laboratories were opened on 14 July 1993 at the far end of 'West Block', an area of the school still known as the 'Science Bungalow'.

On the event of Yarborough School's 25th anniversary the RAF's Red Arrows, which are based in Lincolnshire, gave a special aerobatic display.

Yarborough School became a Business and Enterprise Specialist School in 2003, the legacy of which continues today, with students studying Business from Year 9 onwards, as well as being a lead centre for delivering Enterprise education and piloting new entrepreneurial initiatives.

By September 2004, funding from the specialist status allowed a number of refurbishments which included three new Business classrooms replacing the old library in 'East Block', the library becoming the Resource Centre, and relocating where the Sixth Form area was with Year 12 and 13 students moving to the stand-alone building previously occupied by Music.

Lincoln Castle Academy
In April 2011 Yarborough School officially became Lincoln Castle Academy, adopting a new identity immediately with a turreted castle tower and a Fleur de Lys from the City of Lincoln’s own coat of arms featuring on the new design.

From September 2011 the new uniform was introduced, featuring a navy blazer with royal blue trim and a blue tie with a diagonal stripe pattern.

Coinciding with Her Majesty Queen Elizabeth II's Diamond Jubilee in 2012 was Headteacher Rob Boothroyd's 60th birthday. Students and staff organised a summer gala at the Academy for the Double Diamond Jubilee, with traditional stalls, games and entertainment acts for the public to see. Lincoln's Member of Parliament, Karl McCartney and Hollywood actor Colin McFarlane were invited as special guests.

Summer 2012 marked a further special occasion for Lincoln Castle Academy when the school site played host to the Lincoln stopover on Day 40 of the Olympic Torch Relay. Student Bo Haywood ran one of the legs with the torch, whilst at the London Games a group of students from Lincoln Castle Academy formed a guard of honour for Guam as that nation's athletes entered the Olympic Stadium.

Mr Phil Cooke, Head of Year 7 (& Transition), is Lincoln Castle Academy's longest-serving current member of teaching staff, having joined in September 1982. Mr Cooke will be sadly retiring from Lincoln Castle Academy at the end of this academic year after nearly 33 years of service to the LCA's (formerly Yarborough School) students.

Headteachers
The following Headteachers have led Lincoln Castle Academy and the previous Yarborough School over the years:

 Eric Wilson September 1970 to July 1993
 Kostek Shanovich September 1993 to June 1999
 Charles Rawding (Acting) June 1999 to September 1999
 Graham Legg September 1999 to July 2003
 Tim Mitchell (Acting) September 2003 to December 2003
 Rob Boothroyd January 2004 to July 2014
 Louise Laming September 2014 to late 2021
 Emma Halpin   Late 2021 to December 2021
 Richard Hanson April 2022 – present

Subjects
In Years 10 and 11 (Key Stage 4) the following subjects are offered:

Core subjects: Life, English, English Literature, Ethics and Religion, ICT, Mathematics, Science and Work Skills.

Optional subjects: Art & Design, Design & Technology, Drama, Geography, Hair Services, Health & Social Care, History, Media, Modern Languages, Music, Performing Arts, Photography, Public Services, Sports Studies and Travel & Tourism.

In Sixth Form (Key Stage 5) the following subjects are offered:

Optional subjects: Applied Science, Art & Design, Biology, Life, Chemistry, Childcare, Countryside Management, Creative Media Production, Drama & Theatre Studies, Engineering, English Language, English Literature, Geography, Hair Services, Health & Social Care, History, Hospitality Management, ICT, Mathematics, Music, Performing Arts, Photography, Physics, Psychology, Public Services, Religious Studies, Resistant Materials, Sociology, Sports Studies, Textiles and Travel & Tourism.

Academic Performance
Lincoln Castle Academy’s GCSE performance for summer 2012:
 A* to C grades including English and Maths 51%
 A* to C grades (all subjects) 95%
 A* to G grades (all subjects) 100%

Its A-level performance for summer 2012:
 A* to B grades 32%
 A* to C grades 59%
 A* to E grades 96%

Enterprise Education
Since gaining Business and Enterprise Specialist Status in 2003, Lincoln Castle Academy has continued to forge a path as being a lead centre for enterprising education.

The three main strands of enterprise education – enterprise capability, financial capability and economic understanding – are interwoven across the Academy’s curriculum.

Successes brought about in Enterprise at Lincoln Castle Academy include:

 Recognised for having developed the ‘Best Business Idea’ in the BBC’s Dragons’ Den Goes Back to School project.
 Forming Local Lincoln – a Community Interest Company managed by Level 3 Business and Media students. Local Lincoln is a Business Directory and Community Magazine which reaches over 6000 homes in North Lincoln.
 Achieving the 2011 SSAT Employer-Education Award for our work with Ruddocks, a Lincoln printing firm. This partnership was recognised nationally in a ceremony at the Guildhall in London.

Notable former pupils
 Tracy Borman (1988 to 1990), Historian].
 Steve Froggatt (1984 to 1989), Former professional footballer (1991-2001). Now a company director and football pundit on BBC television and radio.
 Tyrone Huntley (2001 to 2006), Singer and actor who specialises in stage musicals.

Notable Staff Achievements
 Jim Aram (2004 to date) Long-distance runner having completed nearly 50 half marathons, 20 marathons and one ultra marathon (50 km), with a personal best time in a full marathon of 3hrs 45mins.
 Gary Jones (2001 to date) Former professional rugby union player with Nottingham RFC.
 Keith WR Jones (2002 to 2013) Motoring journalist at Bauer Media and winner of the inaugural Guild of Motoring Writers' Breakthrough Blogger Award in 2012.
 Glenn Moore (1985 to date) Long-distance runner having completed numerous half marathons and marathons, with a personal best time in a full marathon of 3hrs 1min, set in 2013.
 Di Pyper (née Lambrechs) (1997 to date) Former South African Junior Speed Skating Champion between 1974 and 1976. Represented South Africa in the 1976 (Madonna di Campiglio, Italy) and 1977 (Inzell, Germany) World Championships.
 Margaret Wilson (2009 to date) Former dancing titlist whose achievements include Warwickshire Tap Champion, Winner of the Great British Irish Dancing Championships and fifth place in the World Irish Dancing Championships.

References

 https://thelincolnite.co.uk/2022/07/parents-fuming-over-heatwave-uniform-saga-at-lincoln-school/
 https://www.lincolnshirelive.co.uk/news/lincoln-news/parents-anger-schools-ridiculous-decision-7348695

External links 
 Lincoln Castle Academy website
 Lincolnshire Echo articles featuring Lincoln Castle Academy
 The Lincolnite articles featuring Lincoln Castle Academy
 Ermine Primary Academy, partner school in the Academy of Lincoln Trust
 Yarborough Leisure Centre

1971 establishments in England
Academies in Lincolnshire
Educational institutions established in 1971
School buildings in the United Kingdom destroyed by arson
Schools in Lincoln, England
Secondary schools in Lincolnshire